The Star Reporter is a 1921 American silent mystery film directed by Duke Worne and starring Billie Rhodes, Truman Van Dyke and William T. Horne.

Synopsis
After her father has been declared insane and confined in a sanatorium, Nan Lambert begins to investigate with the assistance of an undercover reporter. Eventually they expose the man behind the whole scheme.

Cast
 Billie Rhodes as Nan Lambert
 Truman Van Dyke as Anthony Trent
 William T. Horne as Conington Warren

References

Bibliography
 Munden, Kenneth White. The American Film Institute Catalog of Motion Pictures Produced in the United States, Part 1. University of California Press, 1997.

External links
 

1921 films
1921 mystery films
1920s English-language films
American silent feature films
American mystery films
Films directed by Duke Worne
Arrow Film Corporation films
1920s American films
Silent mystery films